Karan Agarwal (born 23 June 1983) is an Indian writer, director, creative director, and presenter known for work in television, web series, digital advertising and podcasts. He has worked on popular youth shows like Selection Day (TV series), Laakhon Mein Ek, Gumrah: End of Innocence, The Suite Life of Karan & Kabir, Kya Mast Hai Life and Bigg Boss. He is the creator and host of podcasts Adventures of Cheap Beer and Eat Sleep Joke Repeat.

Work
Writer
Kya Mast Hai Life (2009–2010)
The Suite Life of Karan & Kabir (2010–2013)
Wordmatch (2012)
Yeh Jawani Ta Ra Ri Ri (2014)
Galli Galli Sim Sim (2014)
Gumrah: End of Innocence (2015)
Laakhon Mein Ek (2017)
Shaitaan Haveli (2017)
Selection Day (TV series) (2018)

Creative director
Bigg Boss (2006–2007)
POGO Amazing Kids Awards (2007)
Champion Chaalbaaz No.1 (2007–2008)
Gumrah: End of Innocence (2015)

Creator
Champion Chaalbaaz No.1 (2007–2008)
Jo Jeeta Wohi Super Star (2008)

Podcasts
Adventures of Cheap Beer (2015–2016)
Eat Sleep Joke Repeat (2016)

References

External links
 Adventuresofcheapbeer.in
 Saa.vn

1983 births
Living people